Johan Etienne Oosthuizen (born 20 July 1994) is a South African rugby union player for the  in the Currie Cup and the Rugby Challenge. He can play as a lock or a flanker.

Rugby career

Youth and Varsity Cup rugby

Oosthuizen was born in Johannesburg. He made three appearances and scored tries against hosts Eastern Province and the Leopards.

He was named in the  squad that participated in the 2013 Under-19 Provincial Championship, as well as the  squad for the 2014 Vodacom Cup, but failed to make any appearances in either competition.

He played rugby for university side , and was included in their Varsity Cup squad for the 2015 and 2016 events. He made four appearances as a replacement in the 2015 event, but was more frequently used in the 2016 season, making five starts and three appearances as a replacement.

Eastern Province Kings

He made his first class debut during the match, coming on for three separate spells during the match; he came on as a temporary blood replacement for both Sebastian Ferreira and Tazz Fuzani in the first half before coming on as a tactical substitution for the final eight minutes.

Pirates

Oosthuizen joined Golden Lions Grand Challenge side Pirates prior to the 2017 season.

References

South African rugby union players
Living people
1994 births
Rugby union players from Johannesburg
Rugby union locks
Rugby union flankers
Eastern Province Elephants players